Oncopeltus is a genus of seed bugs in the family Lygaeidae, which has at least 40 described species.

Species
These 40 species belong to the genus Oncopeltus:

 Oncopeltus atrorufus (Guerin, 1838)
 Oncopeltus aulicus Fabricius, 1775
 Oncopeltus bergianus Kirkaldy, 1909
 Oncopeltus bicinctus (Montrouzier, 1861)
 Oncopeltus bueanus Karsch, 1892
 Oncopeltus cayensis Torre-Bueno, 1944
 Oncopeltus cingulifer Stal, 1874
 Oncopeltus confusus Horvath, 1914
 Oncopeltus erebus Distant, 1918
 Oncopeltus famelicus Fabricius, 1781
 Oncopeltus fasciatus (Dallas, 1852) (large milkweed bug)
 Oncopeltus femoralis Stal, 1874
 Oncopeltus guttaloides Slater, 1964
 Oncopeltus jacobsoni Horvath, 1914
 Oncopeltus limbicollis Horvath, 1914
 Oncopeltus longicornis Horvath, 1914
 Oncopeltus longirostris Stal, 1874
 Oncopeltus luctuosus (Stal, 1867)
 Oncopeltus maoricus (Walker, 1872)
 Oncopeltus mayri Slater, 1964
 Oncopeltus microps Horvath, 1914
 Oncopeltus miles (Blanchard, 1852)
 Oncopeltus nigriceps (Dallas, 1852)
 Oncopeltus nigripennis Horvath, 1914
 Oncopeltus nigroflavatus Distant, 1918
 Oncopeltus niloticus Distant, 1918
 Oncopeltus orourkeae Faúndez & Rocca, 2017
 Oncopeltus peringueyi (Distant, 1911)
 Oncopeltus pictus Van Duzee, 1907
 Oncopeltus purpurascens Distant, 1901
 Oncopeltus quadriguttatus Fabricius, 1775
 Oncopeltus sandarachatus (Say, 1831)
 Oncopeltus sanguineolentus Van Duzee, 1914 (blood-colored milkweed bug)
 Oncopeltus semilimbatus Stal, 1874
 Oncopeltus sexmaculatus Stal, 1874 (six-spotted milkweed bug)
 Oncopeltus sordidus (Dallas, 1852)
 Oncopeltus spectabilis Van Duzee, 1909
 Oncopeltus unifasciatellus Slater, 1964
 Oncopeltus varicolor (Fabricius, 1794)
 Oncopeltus zonatus (Erichson, 1848)

References

Further reading

External links

 

Lygaeidae
Articles created by Qbugbot
Pentatomomorpha genera
Taxa named by Carl Stål